Edward S. Marcus High School is a public high school in Flower Mound, Texas. It is a part of the Lewisville Independent School District.

Academics
Marcus High School was named a National Blue Ribbon School by the U.S. Department of Education in 1994–96.

Athletics
Edward S. Marcus High School competes as part of the University Interscholastic League in District 6-6A. Since 1986, Marcus High School and nearby Lewisville High School have competed in an annual rivalry football game dubbed the "Battle of the Axe". In 2000, the first "Mound Showdown" game was played between Marcus and neighboring Flower Mound High School.

The Marcus Marauders compete in the following UIL sports:
Football,
Basketball,
Soccer,
Baseball,
Softball,
Wrestling,
Cheerleading,
Track & Field,
Cross Country,
Golf,
Swim,
Dive,
Tennis, and
Volleyball.

The school fields a combined ice hockey team with Flower Mound High School in non-UIL competitions. The school has a full football field, and an off campus baseball field.

Ninth grade center

After the Lewisville ISD school board raised concerns over overpopulation in 2008, the Marcus 9th Grade Center opened in August 2014. Common freshman courses are offered on the campus, including English I, Algebra I, Geometry, World Geography, and Biology. Students also have the option to take elective courses on the main campus.

Demographics
The demographic breakdown of the 3,092 students attending in 20192020 was:
White - 70.4%
Hispanic - 14.0%
Asian - 8.2%
African American - 3.8%
American Indian - 0.3%
Pacific Islander - 0.1%
Two or more races - 3.2%

7.5% of students were eligible for free or reduced-price lunch and considered "economically disadvantaged" by the Texas Education Agency. 1.6% of students' primary language was one other than English and 11.7% of students received special education services.

Lone Star Classic
Since 2010 the annual Lone Star Classic drumline competition has been staged at the Stadium at Marcus High School.

Notable alumni

Ryan Pressly – Houston Astros pitcher, World Series Champion.
Marcus Smart – Boston Celtics guard
Sam Garza – former professional soccer player
Sarah Huffman – retired professional soccer player and women's national team member
Scott Michael Foster – actor
Jasen Rauch – Breaking Benjamin guitarist
Hayley Orrantia – actress
Ryan Pace – former Chicago Bears general manager
Chris Sanders – former NFL and Arena Football quarterback
Cooper Land – former professional basketball player
Mason Cox – Australian Football League ruckman with Collingwood
Alexis Tipton — voice actress affiliated with Funimation
Josh Carraway — NFL Free Agent linebacker
Paxton Pomykal — FC Dallas midfielder
Jason Neill — professional footballer
Kaden Smith — New York Giantsformer tight end
Colin Poche — Tampa Bay Rays pitcher
Keaton Sutherland — Cincinnati Bengals offensive lineman
Greyson "Goldenglue" Gilmer — professional League of Legends Coach, Head Coach for 100 Thieves Academy
Garrett Nussmeier — LSU Tigers quarterback
Emma Sralla — discus thrower

References

External links
Marcus High School Home Page

Marcus
Flower Mound, Texas
Marcus
1981 establishments in Texas